Stade Jules-Ladoumègue may refer to:

 , a stadium in Paris
 Stade Jules-Ladoumègue (Paris), a stadium in Paris
 Stade Jules-Ladoumègue (Romorantin-Lanthenay), a stadium in Romorantin-Lanthenay
 Stade Jules-Ladoumègue (Vitrolles), a stadium in Vitrolles